John Carrell  may refer to:

John Carrell (American football), American football player for the Houston Oilers, see 1965 NFL Draft
John Carrell, American ice dancer
John Carrell, High Sheriff of Sussex and High Sheriff of Surrey

See also
John Carroll (disambiguation)
John Caryll (disambiguation)